Gahnia vitiensis is a tussock-forming perennial in the family Cyperaceae, that is native to Fiji and Hawaii.

References

vitiensis
Plants described in 1909
Flora of Hawaii
Flora of Fiji
Taxa named by Alfred Barton Rendle